Sutherland was a Scottish constituency of the House of Commons of the Parliament of Great Britain from 1708 to 1801 and of the Parliament of the United Kingdom from 1801 to 1918.

Creation
The British parliamentary constituency was created in 1708 following the Acts of Union, 1707 and replaced the former Parliament of Scotland shire constituency of Sutherlandshire.

Boundaries
The constituency represented essentially the traditional county of Sutherland.  The county town of Dornoch, however, was represented as a component of the Tain Burghs constituency, from 1708 to 1832, and of the Wick Burghs constituency, from 1832 to 1918.

History
The constituency elected one Member of Parliament (MP) by the first past the post system until the seat was abolished in 1918.

 In 1918 the Sutherland constituency and Dornoch were merged into the then new constituency of Caithness and Sutherland. In 1997 Caithness and Sutherland was merged into Caithness, Sutherland and Easter Ross.

Members of Parliament

Elections

Elections in the 1830s

Innes' death caused a by-election.

Elections in the 1840s
Howard resigned by accepting the office of Steward of the Chiltern Hundreds, causing a by-election.

Dundas was appointed Solicitor General for Scotland, requiring a by-election.

Dundas was appointed Judge Advocate General of the Armed Forces, requiring a by-election.

Elections in the 1850s

Elections in the 1860s
Sutherland-Leveson-Gower succeeded to the peerage, becoming 3rd Duke of Sutherland, and causing a by-election.

Dundas resigned, causing a by-election.

Elections in the 1870s

Elections in the 1880s

Elections in the 1890s

Sutherland was appointed Chairman of the Fishery Board for Scotland, causing a by-election.

Elections in the 1900s

Elections in the 1910s

General Election 1914–15:

Another General Election was required to take place before the end of 1915. The political parties had been making preparations for an election to take place and by the July 1914, the following candidates had been selected; 
Liberal: Alpheus Morton
Unionist: Theodore Gervase Chambers

References

See also 

Historic parliamentary constituencies in Scotland (Westminster)
Sutherland
Constituencies of the Parliament of the United Kingdom disestablished in 1918
Constituencies of the Parliament of the United Kingdom established in 1708